Harlond Benton "Darkie" Clift (August 12, 1912 – April 27, 1992) was a Major League Baseball (MLB) third baseman for the St. Louis Browns (1934–1943) and the Washington Senators (1943–1945). He was an All-Star for the American League in 1937.

Early life
Clift was born in El Reno, Oklahoma. He tried out for the St. Louis Browns in 1931 and sustained an unusual injury during the tryout. While reaching to field a ball, Clift stepped on his own glove, which caused him to trip and roll forward. He broke his collarbone in the fall. Nonetheless, the Browns signed Clift and he made his major-league debut in 1934.

Career

In 1937, he set single-season records of 50 double plays and 405 assists that stood until 1971. The following year, Clift hitting a personal best 34 home runs and equaling his top year for runs batted in, with 118.

Clift was traded to the Washington Senators in 1943. A serious case of the mumps and a horse-riding injury hampered Clift's play late in his career. In 12 seasons, Clift played in 1,582 games, and had 1,558 hits in 5,730 at bats for a .272 batting average. He belted 178 career homers, 309 doubles, 62 triples and 829 RBI. He scored 1,070 runs and drew 1,070 bases on balls.  Clift was one of the first power-hitting third basemen, posting his offensive numbers at a time when players at that position were more valued for their fielding. However, Clift was also regarded as a superb fielder.

Clift's nickname, "Darkie", has what Bill James referred to as "a rather unpleasant derivation": One of his Browns teammates, Alan Strange, misheard Clift's first name and thought that it was Harlem, a predominantly Black area in New York.

Clift died in Yakima, Washington, at the age of 79.

See also
 List of Major League Baseball career runs scored leaders

References

External links

1912 births
1992 deaths
American League All-Stars
Baseball players from Oklahoma
Detroit Tigers scouts
Longview Cannibals players
Major League Baseball third basemen
People from El Reno, Oklahoma
St. Louis Browns players
San Antonio Missions players
Sportspeople from Yakima, Washington
Washington Senators (1901–1960) players
Wichita Falls Spudders players
Yakima Stars players